Myoleja angusta is a species of fruit flies in the genus Myoleja of the family Tephritidae.

References

angusta